NJ Transit Rail Operations provides passenger service on 12 lines at a total of 166 stations, some operated in conjunction with Amtrak and Metro-North Railroad (MNR).

NJ Transit Rail Operations (NJTR) was established by NJ Transit (NJT) to run commuter rail operations in New Jersey. In January 1983 it took over operation from Conrail, which itself had been formed in 1976 through the merger of a number of financially troubled railroads and had been operating commuter railroad service under contract from the New Jersey Department of Transportation (NJDOT). Soon after its creation, NJT commissioned a survey of operating stations, 53 of which were eventually nominated and listed on the state and federal registers of historic places in 1984. Since 2009, NJT is a stakeholder in the state's "smart growth" transit-oriented development initiatives, its transit hubs forming the basis for transit villages.

The regional rail network, which serves the northern and central parts of New Jersey and Rockland and Orange counties in New York, radiates from Hoboken Terminal in Hoboken, Pennsylvania Station in Midtown Manhattan, and Pennsylvania Station in Newark. Lines intersect at Secaucus Junction. Service from Atlantic City to Center City, Philadelphia is provided by one line separate from the rest of the NJT system, though SEPTA Regional Rail service connects Philadelphia and Trenton. Amtrak provides service in New Jersey along the Northeast Corridor (NEC) between Newark and Trenton and at intermediate points.

Since its inception, NJT has closed several stations and opened new ones reflecting infrastructure improvements and discontinuance or additions in service. Some station locations, not listed here, became part of the Hudson-Bergen Light Rail and the River Line, both of which were largely built along existing railroad rights-of-way. New and re-opened stations are being built or proposed along planned expansions and extensions, notably the Lackawanna Cut-Off, which is under reconstruction. Restoration of passenger service along the West Trenton Line, Monmouth-Ocean-Middlesex project right-of-ways, and the Raritan Valley/Lehigh Line, which include the reactivation/construction of new stations, have all been considered but not advanced.

Services

Station designations

Historic register listings

In 1981, NJT commissioned the State Historic Preservation Office (SHPO) to conduct a study of 112 train stations under its jurisdiction built before World War II that were still in operation. Many of thematic nomination stations are listed on the New Jersey Register of Historic Places (ID#5080) on March 17, 1984. The SHPO recommended that fifty-three stations, some of which had already been listed, be included in a thematic nomination for listing on the National Register of Historic Places. Forty stations were added on June 22, 1984 and the remainder added on September 29, 1984. (#64000496) Most were along former lines and heritage railroads that had become part of NJT, while West Trenton Station is used by SEPTA.

The oldest station building, built in 1868 at the Ramsey-Main Street station, was not listed. The oldest active station to be listed on NRHP was Hackensack's 1869-built Anderson Street station, until it was destroyed in a fire and explosion in 2009, and thus was delisted. Proposals to revive service on the West Trenton Line and Lackawanna Cut-Off include the re-use of some listed stations in both New Jersey and northeastern Pennsylvania.

Two significant individually-listed historic stations include Newark Pennsylvania Station and Hoboken Terminal, both of which are major stations that also serve as terminals for light rail, PATH subway trains, and in the case of Hoboken, ferries across the Hudson River to Pier 11 at Wall Street and the Battery Park City Ferry Terminal.

Transit villages
The NJDOT established the Transit Village Initiative in 1999 to promote transit-oriented development (TOD), offering multi-agency assistance and grants to municipalities for projects which fulfill certain conditions to promote higher density development and use of public transportation within a  radius of a transit hub,  specifying appropriate mixed land-use strategy, available property, station-area management, and commitment to affordable housing, job growth/maintenance, and cultural activities. Transit village development must also preserve the architectural integrity of historically significant buildings and the landscape. , the state had made 30 transit village designations, many of which are centered around "Main Street" or central business district train stations. Since 2008, there has been significant population growth and increased ridership in neighborhoods around stations.

Active stations

Operated by NJ Transit

Operated by others
Metro-North Railroad's West-of-Hudson service is operated by NJ Transit. NJ Transit owns the Pascack Valley Line right-of-way (ROW) and stations, which are leased to Metro-North. On the Port Jervis Line north of Suffern, Metro-North owns or leases the ROW under an agreement with Norfolk Southern Railway and operates the stations. Two SEPTA Regional Rail lines terminate at stations in New Jersey, one of which is not served NJ Transit.

Proposed and future stations
Between 2008 and 2016, NJT added four infill stations on existing lines. , one additional infill station is planned.

Several other lines are proposed for restoration. Parts of the Lackawanna Cut-Off Restoration Project in New Jersey have been implemented and there are proposals to extend the line west and into northeastern Pennsylvania. Restoration of service along the West Trenton Line between West Trenton (with connecting service to SEPTA's West Trenton Line) and Bridgewater where it would junction with the Raritan Valley Line (RVL) has been proposed, but not advanced. Extension of the Raritan Valley Line in connection with the Lehigh Line into Lehigh County, Pennsylvania has also been considered.

Infill stations

Proposed expansion stations

Former stations
NJ Transit has closed numerous stations since its inception due to realignments in service or low ridership.

See also
Timeline of Jersey City area railroads
List of companies transferred to Conrail
List of Metro-North Railroad stations
List of Long Island Rail Road stations
List of SEPTA Regional Rail stations
List of United States commuter rail systems by ridership
List of New Jersey railroad junctions

Bibliography

References

External links 
NJ Transit station guide
Metro-North station guide

NJ Transit train stations
NJ Transit
NJ Transit
Transit stations
New Jersey Register of Historic Places